Ila Pant (born 10 March 1938) is an Indian politician who was a Member of Parliament in 12th Lok Sabha from Nainital constituency of Uttar Pradesh (now part of Uttarakhand). She was married to former minister K. C. Pant.

Personal life and family

Ila Pant was born in Nainital district ( Uttarakhand ) on 10 March 1938. She is the daughter of Shobha and Govind Ballabh Pande. She graduated from the University of Allahabad with a Bachelor of Arts degree. On 20 June 1957, she married the politician Krishna Chandra Pant from Uttarakhand Brahmin family  . The couple has two sons.

Politics 

Ila Pant's father-in-law Govind Ballabh Pant was a key architect of modern India and a senior Indian National Congress leader, and her husband went on to become a minister as well. She won the 1998 general election as a Bharatiya Janata Party (BJP) candidate, winning 38.52% of the votes in the Nainital constituency. She defeated the former Chief Minister and Congress leader Narayan Dutt Tiwari by a margin of 15,557 votes.

During 1998-99, she served as a member of the Committee on External Affairs and of the Consultative Committee, Ministry of External Affairs.

She has also served on the Board of Governors of the Pant Nagar University, and as a Secretary of the G.B. Pant Memorial Society in New Delhi.

References

External links 

Biographical Sketch - Member of Parliament 12th Lok Sabha
Interview of K. C. Pant

Living people
India MPs 1998–1999
University of Allahabad alumni
1938 births
Bharatiya Janata Party politicians from Uttarakhand
Women in Uttarakhand politics
People from Nainital district
20th-century Indian women
20th-century Indian people